Wilfred Blatherwick (September 19, 1870 – April 7, 1956) was an American tennis player. He competed in the men's singles and doubles events at the 1904 Summer Olympics.

References

External links
 

1870 births
1956 deaths
American male tennis players
Olympic tennis players of the United States
Tennis players at the 1904 Summer Olympics
People from Black Hawk County, Iowa
Tennis people from Iowa